The 1997 Cup of Russia was the fifth event of six in the 1997–98 ISU Champions Series, a senior-level international invitational competition series. It was held in Saint Petersburg on November 19–23. Medals were awarded in the disciplines of men's singles, ladies' singles, pair skating, and ice dancing. Skaters earned points toward qualifying for the 1997–98 Champions Series Final.

Results

Men

Ladies

Pairs

Ice dancing

External links
 1997 Cup of Russia

Cup of Russia
Cup of Russia
Rostelecom Cup
November 1997 sports events in Russia